Street Fighter II Turbo: Hyper Fighting is a competitive fighting game released by Capcom for arcades in 1992. It is the third arcade version of Street Fighter II, part of the Street Fighter franchise, following Street Fighter II: Champion Edition, and was initially released as an enhancement kit for that game. Released less than a year after the previous installment, Turbo introduced a faster playing speed and new special moves for certain characters, as well as further refinement to the character balance.

Turbo is the final arcade game in the Street Fighter II series to use the original CP System hardware. It was distributed as an upgrade kit designed to be installed into Champion Edition printed circuit boards. The next game, Super Street Fighter II, uses the CP System's successor, the CP System II.

Gameplay

Turbo features faster playing speed compared to Champion Edition. As a result, the inputs for special moves and combos requires more precise timing. The faster playing speed also allowed players to get into battle quicker, as well as to react quicker. All of the fighters, with the exception of Guile and the four Shadaloo Bosses, were each given at least one new special move.

Each fighter also received a new default palette. The original palettes are now featured as alternate palettes for each character, replacing the ones that were in Champion Edition. The only character exempt to this change is M. Bison, who retains his original default palette, but still gets a different alternate palette.

Ports

Super NES
A port was released for the Super Famicom on July 11, 1993 in Japan, and for the Super Nintendo Entertainment System (Super NES) in August 1993 in North America and October 1993 in the PAL region. The port was developed using the SNES port of the original Street Fighter II as its base, but with a larger cartridge size of 20 Megabits. Despite being titled Turbo, this port also contains the Champion Edition version of the game in the form of a "Normal" mode. The game's playing speed is adjustable in Turbo mode by up to four settings by default, with a cheat code that allows up to six faster settings. Other cheat codes allow players to enable and disable special moves in Versus mode, as well as play through the single-player mode with all of the special moves disabled.

The pitch change in the characters' voices when they perform a variation of their special moves based on the strength level of the attack was removed, but the voice clips of the announcer saying the names of each country were restored, along with the barrel-breaking bonus stage that was removed in the first SNES port. The graphics of each character's ending were changed to make them more accurate to the arcade version. Sound effects featuring people or animals shouting after a round ended were added as well, an aesthetic element that was not present in the arcade version of Turbo, but rather was added in Super Street Fighter II.

Nintendo re-released Turbo in September 2017 as part of the company's Super NES Classic Edition.

Other releases
The Sega Mega Drive/Genesis version, Street Fighter II: Special Champion Edition, while based primarily on Champion Edition, allows players to play the game with Turbo rules as well. The game's content is almost identical to the SNES version of Street Fighter II Turbo.

Turbo is included in Street Fighter Collection 2 (Capcom Generation 5) for the Sega Saturn and PlayStation. The PlayStation port was later included in Capcom Classics Collection Vol. 1 for PlayStation 2 and Xbox, as well as Capcom Classics Collection: Reloaded for the PlayStation Portable. A stand-alone re-release of Hyper Fighting was also released for the Xbox 360 via Xbox Live Arcade which features an online versus mode. It was also released for the iPod Touch, iPhone, iPad, and Android, along with Street Fighter II and Champion Edition, as part of Capcom Arcade.

Reception

Arcade
In Japan, Game Machine listed Street Fighter II' Turbo on their February 1, 1993 issue as being the second most-successful table arcade cabinet of the month, outperforming titles such as Warriors of Fate and Street Fighter II': Champion Edition. Street Fighter II' Turbo went on to become the highest-grossing arcade game of 1993 in Japan.

In North America, the RePlay arcade charts listed Street Fighter II Turbo as the top-grossing software conversion kit in March 1993, and then again April and June 1993. It was also one of the five top-grossing arcade games during Summer 1993.

Console
In Japan, the Super Famicom version topped the Famitsu sales charts in July 1993.

Worldwide, the SNES version sold  copies in total.

Accolades
In the February 1994 issue of Gamest, Street Fighter II' Turbo, along with Super Street Fighter II, was nominated for Best Game of 1993, but lost to Samurai Spirits. Turbo was ranked as sixth, while placing fifth in the category of Best Fighting Games. Nintendo Power rated the game the third best SNES game of 1993.

Retrospective

In 1996, GamesMaster ranked the game 9th on their "Top 100 Games of All Time." In 1997, Electronic Gaming Monthly listed Street Fighter II Turbo as the best arcade game of all time. They also listed the Super NES conversion as the fifth best console game of all time, explaining that it was the last and best refinement of Street Fighter II before the basic formula of the series changed with the Super and Alpha installments. In 2018, Complex rated the game 6th on their The Best Super Nintendo Games of All Time and called the game the best fighting game on the SNES.

Notes

References

Further reading

External links

1992 video games
Capcom Power System Changer games
CP System games
Street Fighter games
Fighting games
2D fighting games
Video game sequels
Arcade video games
Video games developed in Japan
Virtual Console games
Virtual Console games for Wii U
Street Fighter II Turbo: Hyper Fighting
Xbox 360 Live Arcade games
Multiplayer and single-player video games